The greater mouse-tailed bat (Rhinopoma microphyllum) is a species of bat in the Rhinopomatidae family.

Range and habitat
It is found in Algeria, Bangladesh, Burkina Faso, the Central African Republic, Chad, Djibouti, Egypt, Eritrea, Ethiopia, India, Indonesia, Iran, Israel, Iraq, Jordan, Libya, Mali, Mauritania, Morocco, Myanmar, Niger, Nigeria, Oman, Pakistan, Saudi Arabia, Senegal, Sudan, Thailand, Tunisia, Western Sahara, and Yemen. Its natural habitat is subtropical or tropical dry shrubland.

Biology and ecology
According to a recent research published in Royal Society of London, the greater mouse-tailed bat hibernates at the unusually warm and constant temperature of 68 °F in caves in Israel's Great Rift Valley. From October to February, these bats were discovered semi-conscious, breathing only once every 15–30 minutes, with extremely low energy expenditures.

The species Rhinopoma microphyllum eats exclusively insects. A study on its diet revealed that the species is primarily a Coleoptera feeder in both maternity and summer quarters, although a more diverse feeding habit is found in the summer roosts. Other prey types include Diptera, Neuroptera and Hymenoptera. They mate at the beginning of spring.

References

Rhinopomatidae
Bats of Africa
Bats of Asia
Bats of South Asia
Mammals of North Africa
Mammals of the Middle East
Mammals of Pakistan
Mammals of Bangladesh
Sahel
Greater mouse-tailed bat
Taxonomy articles created by Polbot
Greater mouse-tailed bat

Bats of India